Green Park or Greenpark can refer to:

Commercial and estate properties
 Aston Clinton House, previously known as Green Park, the historic site of a former mansion
 Green Park Business Park, a business park near junction 11 of the M4 motorway on the outskirts of Reading, England

Places
 Green Park, Delhi, a locality in South Delhi district, India
 Green Park, London, one of the Royal Parks of London, England
 Green Park, Missouri, a city in the US
 Green Park, Pennsylvania, an incorporated village in the US
 Green Park, Prince Edward Island, Canada

Sports venues
 Green Park Stadium, a cricket ground in Kanpur, India
 Greenpark Racecourse, Limerick, Ireland, a former racecourse

Transportation
 Bath Green Park railway station, a closed Midland Railway station in the city of Bath, England
 Green Park tube station, a station on the London Underground in London
 Reading Green Park railway station, was a proposed railway station in Reading, England
 Green Park metro station, a station on the Delhi Metro in Delhi